BGFIBank Group, whose full name is BGFIBank Group S.A., is a financial services organization headquartered in Gabon. The group has subsidiaries in eight countries including Gabon, Benin, Republic of the Congo, Democratic Republic of the Congo, Equatorial Guinea, Madagascar, France and Cote d'Ivoire.

Overview
BGFIBank Group is a large financial services conglomerate in  Central, West and East Africa, with subsidiaries in ten countries. The member institutions serve both individuals and businesses, with emphasis on small-to-medium enterprises (SMEs). As of December 2010, the Group's assets were in excess of €3.7 billion. In January 2010, BGFIGroup was rated the largest bank group in Central Africa, by assets.

History
In 1971, the group started with one institution in Gabon called Bank of Paris and the Netherlands Gabon.  That first bank was a joint venture between several  private Gabonese investors, BNP Paribas and the Netherlands.

The group's first subsidiary was set up in 1987 under the name FIGADIM and was later renamed BGFIBail. In 1996, when Gabonese private investors acquired majority shareholding in the bank, it rebranded as the International Gabonese and French Bank known in French,   as    "Banque Gabonaise et Française Internationale" (BGFI). The Group's second subsidiary, Financiere Transafricaine (Finatra), was established in 1997.

In 2000, the bank rebranded to BGFIBank S.A., which is its current name. During the next ten years, the group has pursued an aggressive expansion policy by opening a subsidiary in Republic of the Congo in 2000, Equatorial Guinea in 2001, France in 2007, Madagascar in 2010, Benin in 2010 and Democratic Republic of the Congo in 2010. During the same decade, a plethora of non-bank financial subsidiaries were set up by the group, the majority being located in Gabon.

At the beginning of 2022, BGFI Cameroon announces the opening of a service dedicated to retail banking. The bank competes directly with First Bank and Société Générale in this market segment.

Corruption 
Congo Hold-Up, the largest leak from the African continent to date, reveals how the commercial bank BGFIBank has been used to plunder the Democratic Republic of Congo’s public funds and natural resources, largely for the enrichment of former President Joseph Kabila’s inner circle. The Congo Hold-Up leak was initiated by French media Mediapart and The Platform to Protect Whistleblowers in Africa, is composed of over 3.5 million internal documents from the BGFIBank, including bank statements, emails, contracts, bills and corporate records.

Member companies
The companies that composes the BGFIBank Group include:

 Commercial banks
 BGFIBank Cameroon -  Cameroon
 BGFIBank Gabon -  Gabon
 BGFIBank Guinea -  Equatorial Guinea
 BGFIBank International -  France
 BGFIBank Congo -  Republic of Congo
 BGFIBank Madagascar -  Madagascar
 BGFIBank Benin -  Benin
 BGFIBank DRC -  Democratic Republic of the Congo

 Other financial services companies
 BGFI Immo - Real estate business -  - Gabon
 BGFI Asset Management - Portfolio management -  - Gabon
 BGFIBail - Leasing -  - Gabon
 BGFIBourse - Financial engineering, stockbroking and consultancy -  Gabon 
 Finatra - Consumer credit -  - Gabon
 BGFICash - Funds transfer -  - Gabon
 BGFIFactor - Factoring -  - Gabon
 LOXIA Emf - Microfinance -  - Gabon
 Socofin - Leasing and consumer credit  Republic of the Congo

Ownership
Shareholding in the Group's stock is private, although dynamic. New investors can buy in, while existing investors have the opportunity to divest. However, the Group's stock is not listed on any publicly traded exchange. The detailed shareholding in BGFIBank Group is illustrated in the table below:

Governance
The Chairman of the eleven member Board of Directors is Patrice Otha. The Chief Executive Officer of the Group is Henri-Claude Oyima and the General Secretary is Brice Laccruche.

See also

 List of banks in Gabon
 List of banks in Africa
 Central Bank of Central African States

References

External links
 Website of BGFIBank Group (French) & (English)
 Website of Central Bank of Central African States (French)
 Company Profile At Afdevinfo.com

Banks of Gabon
Companies based in Libreville
Gabonese companies established in 1971
Banks established in 1971